The Immigration Act 1971 (c 77) is an Act of the Parliament of the United Kingdom concerning immigration and nearly entirely remaking the field of British immigration law. The Act, as with the Commonwealth Immigrants Act 1962, and that of 1968, restricts immigration, especially primary immigration into the UK. It introduced the concept of patriality or right of abode. It was also partly passed to legally clarify the rights of Commonwealth citizens within the United Kingdom in preparation for membership of the European Communities (EC) in which the United Kingdom would become a member state from 1 January 1973. It was coincidentally the same day which the Act came into full legal force which gave not only new automatic rights to EC member state citizens but would also give them priority over non-EC citizens (including overseas Commonwealth citizens) under the obligations of the Treaty of Rome, of which the UK become a signatory though the Treaty of Accession, signed on 22 January 1972. In relation to deportation notices, the Act is referenced at sections 11 and 23 of the Terrorism Act 2000.

Background
Harold Wilson's Labour government proposed the Commonwealth Immigrants act of 1968 in response to the possibility of 200,000 Asian immigrants leaving Kenya in 1967 due to its attempts at 'Africanisation'. The act was passed in just three days, partly due to the support and fierce drive of then-Home Secretary, James Callaghan. This broke away from the non-discriminatory immigration policy that had preceded it. The UK Government saw a need to appease Canada, New Zealand, and Australia over the future negative impact on them when Britain would join the European Communities, a matter which would be hardest on people who had emigrated from Britain in the expectation of continued close ties.

Summary
One result of the Act was to stop the permanent migration of workers from the overseas members of the Commonwealth of Nations, unless they met certain tests. It elaborated the definition of "patrial" migrants, first introduced in the Commonwealth Immigrants Act 1968, as persons born in the United Kingdom and persons who had resided there for the previous five years or longer.

Right of abode
The Act limited the right to enter and live in the United Kingdom to certain subsets of Citizens of the United Kingdom and Colonies with ties to the UK itself.

That wording of the measure introduced minor confusion into the concept of the right of abode, when it limited right of abode through descent to a CUKC who had a parent who had CUKC status by "birth, adoption, naturalisation or .... registration in the United Kingdom or in any of the islands" or a grandparent CUKC who "at the time of that birth or adoption so had it".

Whether "so had it" referred to a grandparent who had CUKC status generally or CUKC status from the UK and islands specifically was decided by the courts to refer to the latter.

The right of abode on 31 December 1982 was necessary to become a British citizen on 1 January 1983 under the automatic transition at commencement of CUKC provisions of the British Nationality Act 1981, so failing to meet the interpretation of the right of abode test above resulted in no British citizenship through that route.

The British Nationality Act 1981 modified the right of abode section of the Immigration Act 1971 to remove the wording at issue, although the former version still had effect for determinations of British citizenship through right of abode for persons born before 1983, and potentially for their descendants.

Immigration Rules
Section 1 of the act provides for "rules laid down by the Secretary of State as to the practice to be followed in the administration of this Act". 

In 1972, the Heath administration introduced the first proposed Immigration Rules under the 1971 act. The rules proposal drew criticism from Conservative Party backbenchers, because it formally implemented a limit of six months of leave to enter as a visitor for white "Old Commonwealth" citizens who were "non-patrial" (did not have Right of Abode under the 1971 act, generally because they did not have a parent or grandparent from the UK). At the same time the proposal opened the door to free movement of certain European workers from European Economic Community member states. Seven backbenchers voted against the proposed Rules and 53 abstained, leading to defeat. Minutes from a Cabinet meeting the next day conclude that "anti-European sentiment" among backbenchers, who instead preferred "Old Commonwealth" migration to the UK, was at the core of the result. The proposal was revised, and the first Rules were passed in January 1973.

By August 2018, the Immigration Rules stood at almost 375,000 words, often so precise and detailed that the service of a lawyer are typically required to navigate them. That length represented nearly a doubling in just a decade. During the period of the introduction of the "hostile environment" policy under Prime Minister Theresa May, more than 1,300 changes were made to the Rules in 2012 alone. Former Lord Justice of Appeal Stephen Irwin referred to the complexity of the system as "something of a disgrace", and an effort to gradually overhaul the Rules into a more understandable system began to take place. The England and Wales Law Commission began to make recommendations for clearer rules to be adopted.

Contents
 Part I Regulation of Entry into and Stay in United Kingdom
 Part II Appeals
 Part III Criminal Proceedings
 Part 3A Maritime enforcement
 Part IV Supplementary
 Schedule 1
 Schedule 2 Administrative Provisions as to Control on Entry etc.
 Schedule 3 Supplementary Provisions as to Deportation
 Schedule 4 Integration with United Kingdom Law of Immigration Law of Islands
 Schedule 4A Enforcement powers in relation to ships
 Schedule 5 The Adjudicators and the Tribunal
 Schedule 6 Repeals

See also
UK labour law
 British nationality law
 History of British nationality law
 Office of the Immigration Services Commissioner

Notes

Further reading

External links

United Kingdom Acts of Parliament 1971
Immigration law in the United Kingdom
British Indian history
Immigration legislation